At the 1900 Summer Olympics, three croquet events were contested. Seven men and three women participated. The doubles competition was scheduled first, though it is unclear whether the French pair that won had any competition. The one-ball singles was played the next week, followed by two-ball singles the week after. France, which supplied all 10 competitors, therefore won all the medals.

This was the only Olympiad where croquet was part of the official programme, though there was the variant called roque at the 1904 Summer Olympics. All events which were restricted to amateurs, open to all nations, open to all competitors, and without handicapping, are now regarded as Olympic events (except for ballooning). Although croquet satisfied three criteria, it had been thought to have an entrant from Belgium, Marcel Haëntjens, (Haëntjens is a Flemish name) and thus have been an international competition. Haëntjens is now known to have been from France, as were the other croquet players. Only one paying spectator attended the event.

Medal table
Sources:

Medal summary

Participating nations
A total of 10 players from 1 nation competed at the Paris Games:

See also
List of Olympic venues in discontinued events
 Roque at the 1904 Summer Olympics

References

 De Wael, Herman. Herman's Full Olympians: "Croquet 1900". Accessed 10 January 2006.
 Mallon, Bill. "The First Two Women Olympians" in Citius, Altius, Fortius, Autumn 1995, No. 3, p. 38. Available in pdf format from the AAFLA .

 
1900 Summer Olympics events
1900 in croquet
Croquet at the Summer Olympics
Croquet competitions in France
Discontinued sports at the Summer Olympics